Ted Prior is an Australian children's author, best known for his works on the children's series of Grug books.

Biography
Ted Prior previously worked as a police officer before studying at the National Art School in Sydney. In 1969, he earned a Diploma in Painting. From 1971 to 1974 he taught at the National Art School in Newcastle, before moving to a farm in 1975. Prior's art mediums include drawing, etching, sculpture and assemblage. His works have been displayed in individual and group exhibitions.

As well as an author, Prior has also worked as an animator.

References

See also
Grug

Australian artists
Australian children's writers
Living people
Date of birth missing (living people)
Place of birth missing (living people)
National Art School alumni
Year of birth missing (living people)